The former St. Matthias' Episcopal Church, now known as the Dietz United Methodist Church, is a historic church in Omaha, Nebraska. It was built in 1888 for the Episcopal Church, and it was designed in the Romanesque Revival and Gothic Revival styles by architect John H.W. Hawkins. It was acquired by the United Methodist Church in 1920. It has been listed on the National Register of Historic Places since November 23, 1980.

References

National Register of Historic Places in Omaha, Nebraska
Gothic Revival architecture in Nebraska
Romanesque Revival architecture in Nebraska
Churches completed in 1888
1888 establishments in Nebraska